Killanny Geraldines are a Gaelic Athletic Association gaelic football team from Killanny parish, County Monaghan, Ireland. The club was founded in 1889. They have never won the Monaghan Senior Football Championship to date but have been runners-up on 3 occasions.

Killanny have a senior team and Minor, U-16, U-14, U-13, U-12, U-10 and U-9 teams. These are very promising juvenile teams. The senior squad are currently in the Senior Football League in Monaghan. The minor team have recently reached the club's first Division 1 championship final since 1976 and successfully brought Fergal O'Hanlon to Killanny.

Pitch
The Killanny Geraldines' GAA club pitch is situated on the Killanny road close to Essexford in County Louth. There are new changing rooms in the new center. Each summer crumb rubber or sand is put on the pitch to help harden the ground. The pitch is built on what was a bog hence the soft ground.

Team
The junior team has been in the lower reaches of Monaghan football for some time now. They recently won the Intermediate League Final and were subsequently promoted to the Senior League and Championship.

2008
2008 was Killanny Geraldines most successful period in terms of underage football. From U12 up to Minor(U18) the club entered six cups and at the end of the year have now won all these cups. The list of cups and Managers are:

U12, U13 and U14 Division 2 Leagues. The U14 team was managed by Michael Crawley, John Kieran and Finbarr Boylan. U12 and U13 both mentored by Paul Grimes, Mickey Callan and Barney Vernon.

U16 Division 3 league and championship double under the guidance of Lornie Duffy, John McMahon, Paul Kiernan and Eamonn Markey. Minor Division 3 league, who were managed by Lornie Duffy, John McMahon, Johnny Quinn, Micheal Quinn and Paul Kiernan.

The Junior manager was Peter Dooley, who also plays on the team. The Juniors finished bottom in Monaghan in this year but with so many talented youngsters coming up through the ranks, a lot of people expect Killanny to be a force for the future.

2009
The U-12 team reached the Division 1 league semi-final in this year.

The U-13's are in second position in Division 1.

The U-14 team won the Division 1 Shield Final by 6 points against a strong Truagh side. The team had drawn and lost to this Truagh team the last 2 times they met. Outstanding young talent and captain of U14 team Adam Kieran.

The U-16's lost in the Final of the Division 2 League against Carrick.

The Minor team finished in 5th place in Division 2 and got to the Championship Semi-Final.

The Senior Team got to the championship semi-final.

2010
The u14's won the division one championship, an achievement which gave Killanny real recognition as a force for the future.

The u16's won the division 2 league and championship.

The minor team made a valiant effort as the start of the year injury to many key players left them playing catch up for the rest of the season. They were unlucky to miss out on 4th place and a semi-final in the last game in which a disallowed goal caused them to lose to Sean McDermott's(finished second in the league) by 2 points and left them behind Carrick by 1 point in the table. Despite beating Carrick twice in the league and the championship. They went on to dismiss Sean McDermott's in the Championship Semi-Final by beating them by 2-10 to 0-2 and restricting them to taking scores from frees. They subsequently defeated the challenge of Corduff in the Championship Final on Saturday 18 September on a score line of 2-8 to 1-9 even when they had a player wrongly sent off and a ref who was biased towards the Corduff team. The improvement in Killanny, who previously lost to Corduff in the league on a scoreline of 6-18 to 3-7, was down to the belief in the players and the sheer desire to come out of the season with some sort of recognition for their persistence.

The senior team struggled with injuries to many key players during their season.

Since 2011
From 2011 things picked up for Killanny. Andy Callan stepped up to take charge of the club as manager and his new approach to training and management inspired the club as they finished top of the Junior League in 2013 but missed out on promotion by losing in the League semi-final.

They picked up in 2014 where they left off the previous and went unbeaten in the first 8 league games eventually losing to Drumnhowan by a point in the 9th game. However, they got back to winning ways immediately against Aghabog in the following game. Despite these initial signs it was once again a near miss for Killanny. This being said, it was not all bad news in 2014 as they secured their first adult title in many years as they won the Reserve League division 3 title in 2014. Callan stepped down after the 2014 campaign as he had felt he had brought the club as far as he could.

However, following poor results in 2015 the new managers stepped down and Andy was reinstated as Manager. They had been knocked out of the championship by this time and only had the league left to play for. By the end of the league Killanny had finished top of the league and had set up a home semi-final with Blackhill in Pairc Eanna. While in recent years Killanny had caved under the pressure at the semi final stage, they righted their previous wrongs and beat Blackhill on a scoreline of 2-11 to 1-09. This win had guaranteed them Intermediate football in 2016 and set up a final with Rockcorry in Drumhowan, who were looking to secure a double having already won the championship. Killanny spoiled Rockcorry's dream of a league and championship double winning the final on a scoreline of 2-07 to 1-05. Conor Vernon proudly lifted the cup in front of travelling Killanny fans.

They began the 2016 campaign was another year that brought more success as Killanny were immediately promoted from Intermediate to Senior on their first attempt. They battled bravely with local rivals Inniskeen in a wet Corduff on 13 November 2016, winning on a scoreline of 1-8 to 0-10. The captain for 2016 was Ronan Duffy.

As of 2021 Killanny are playing in the Intermediate league in Monaghan.

References

Gaelic games clubs in County Monaghan
Gaelic football clubs in County Monaghan